A gradiometer measures the gradient (numerical rate of change) of a physical quantity, such as a magnetic field or gravity.

Types of gradiometer 

There are at least two types of gradiometer to measure magnetic fields:

 Axial gradiometer. This device consists of two magnetometers placed in series (i.e., one above the other).  The result coming from the device is the difference in magnetic flux at that point in space, in other words, the result is the difference between what each of the magnetometers detects.
 Biaxial gradiometer.  This device consists of three magnetometers measuring the gradient of the magnetic field in two directions.
 Triaxial gradiometer.  This device consists of four magnetometers measuring the gradient of the magnetic field in three directions.
 Planar gradiometer.  This device consists of two magnetometers placed next to each other.  The result coming from the device is the difference in flux between the two loops.

Each sensor type responds differently to certain spatial signals.

Axial gradiometers are good for measuring depth, while planar gradiometers can measure weak signals even under a lot of noise.

See also 
 Gravity gradiometry
 Magnetoencephalography
 Geophysical survey (archaeology)

References 

Measuring instruments